24 teams competed in the 2006 FIVB Volleyball Women's World Championship, with two places allocated for the hosts, Japan and the titleholder, Italy. In the qualification process for the 2006 FIVB World Championship, the Five FIVB confederations were allocated a share of the 22 remaining spots.

Qualified teams
{| class="wikitable sortable" style="text-align: left;"
|-
!width="140"|Team
!width="80"|Confederation
!width="200"|Qualified as
!width="110"|Qualified on
!width="70"|Appearancein finals
|-
|  || AVC ||  || || 
|-
|  || CEV ||  ||  || 
|-
|  || CAVB ||  ||  || 
|-
|  || CAVB ||  ||  || 
|-
|  || CEV ||  ||  || 
|-
|  || CEV ||  ||  || 
|-
|  || CEV ||  ||  || 
|-
|  || CEV ||  ||  || 
|-
|  || CAVB ||  ||  || 
|-
|  || AVC ||  ||  || 
|-
|  || AVC ||  ||  || 
|-
|  || AVC ||  ||  || 
|-
|  || AVC ||  ||  || 
|-
|  || CEV ||  ||  || 
|-
|  || CEV ||  ||  || 
|-
|  || NORCECA ||  ||  || 
|-
|  || NORCECA ||  ||  || 
|-
|  || NORCECA ||  ||  || 
|-
|  || CEV ||  ||  || 
|-
|  || NORCECA ||  ||  || 
|-
|  || NORCECA ||  ||  || 
|-
|  || NORCECA ||  ||  || 
|-
|  || CSV ||  ||  || 
|-
|  || CSV ||  ||  || 
|}

1.Competed as West Germany from 1956 to 1990; 4th appearance as Germany.
2.Competed as Yugoslavia from 1978 to 1990; 1st appearance as Serbia and Montenegro.
3.Competed as Soviet Union from 1952 to 1990; 4th appearance as Russia.

Confederation qualification processes
The distribution by confederation for the 2006 FIVB Women's Volleyball World Championship was:

 Asia and Oceania (AVC): 4 places (+ Japan qualified automatically as host nation for a total of 5 places)
 Africa (CAVB): 3 places
 Europe (CEV): 7 places (+ Italy qualified automatically as the defending champions for a total of 8 places)
 South America (CSV) 2 places
 North, Central America and Caribbean (NORCECA): 6 places

AVC

  (First Round)
  (First Round)
  (First Round)
  (First Round)
  (First Round)
  (First Round)
  (First Round)
  (First Round)
  (First Round)
  (First Round)

CAVB

  (First Round)
  (First Round)
  (First Round)
  (First Round)
  (First Round)
  (First Round)
  (First Round)
  (First Round)
  (First Round)
  (First Round)
  (First Round)
  (First Round)
  (First Round)

CEV

  (First Round)
  (First Round)
  (Second Round, Third Round)
  (First Round, Second Round)
  (First Round, Second Round, Third Round)
  (First Round)
  (Third Round, Playoff Round)
  (Second Round)
  (Second Round, Third Round)
  (First Round)
  (First Round)
  (First Round, Second Round)
  (Third Round)
  (Second Round, Third Round)
  (Third Round)
  (First Round)
  (Third Round, Playoff Round)
  (First Round)
  (Second Round)
  (Third Round)
  (First Round)
  (First Round, Second Round, Third Round)
  (Second Round)
  (First Round)
  (First Round, Second Round)
  (Third Round)
  (Second Round, Third Round, Playoff Round)

CSV

  (First Round)
  (First Round)
  (First Round)
  (First Round)
  (First Round)

NORCECA

  (First Round)
  (First Round, Second Round)
  (First Round)
  (Second Round)
  (First Round)
  (Second Round)
  (Second Round)
  (First Round)
  (Second Round)
  (First Round, Second Round)
  (First Round)
  (First Round, Second Round)
  (First Round, Second Round)
  (First Round)
  (First Round)
  (First Round)
  (Second Round)
  (First Round)
  (Second Round)

References

External links
FIVB

2006 FIVB Volleyball Women's World Championship
FIVB Volleyball World Championship qualification